Simon David Upton  (born 7 February 1958) is a former New Zealand politician and member of Parliament from 1981 to 2001, representing the National Party, and the current Parliamentary Commissioner for the Environment.

Early life
Upton was educated at Southwell School, St Paul's Collegiate School and the University of Auckland, where he gained degrees in English literature, music and law, and Wolfson College, Oxford, as a Rhodes Scholar.

Member of Parliament

Having joined the National Party in 1976, he served as Chairman of the New Zealand Young Nationals among other positions and became the then-youngest MP for Waikato in the 1981 election. In the 1984 election, he was elected MP for Raglan, which he held until the 1996 election, when he chose to become a list MP.

Cabinet minister

Upton became one of New Zealand's youngest ever Ministers in the Cabinet in 1990, when he became Minister of Health, Minister for the Environment, and Minister of Research, Science and Technology. As Environment minister, Upton promoted the enactment of the Resource Management Act 1991.  He was responsible for establishing the Crown Research Institutes. One of Upton's most controversial actions whilst holding the health portfolio was introducing public hospital outpatient charges of $50 per night, this was later abandoned as the 1993 election approached. He also has an interest in sustainable development, and chaired the OECD's Round Table on Sustainable Development and is a founding member of the Board of the Holcim Foundation for Sustainable Construction.

Upton was sworn to the Privy Council in 1999.

After National was defeated at the 1999 election Upton was appointed Spokesperson for Foreign Affairs, Superannuation and Culture and Heritage by leader Jenny Shipley.

Life after politics
He resigned from Parliament in 2001, and moved to France. He took up a full-time post at the OECD as the chair of the Round Table on Sustainable Development which he held until 2005. He was also a part-time consultant at PriceWaterhouseCoopers for several years. In April 2010 he was appointed as the head of the OECD Environment Directorate, in Paris, France.

In April 2017, he was appointed by Parliament to be the next Parliamentary Commissioner for the Environment. He replaced the previous commissioner, Dr Jan Wright, when her second five-year term ended in October 2017.

Personal life
He has two adult children.

Notes

References

External links

Simon Upton's website
NZ Vice Chancellors' Committee (PDF) "1982/Rt Hon Simon David Upton/Auckland/Wolfson "

|-

|-

|-

1958 births
Alumni of Wolfson College, Oxford
New Zealand Rhodes Scholars
Living people
Members of the Cabinet of New Zealand
New Zealand National Party MPs
University of Auckland alumni
New Zealand members of the Privy Council of the United Kingdom
New Zealand list MPs
New Zealand MPs for North Island electorates
Members of the New Zealand House of Representatives
People educated at St Paul's Collegiate School
21st-century New Zealand politicians